The Roads Act 1920 was an Act of the Parliament of the United Kingdom which established the Road Fund, and introduced tax discs.

Clauses
The Act:
Required county councils to register all new vehicles and to allocate a separate number to each vehicle, in a continuation of the vehicle registration scheme introduced under the Motor Car Act 1903
It clarified the situation regarding cars driven by internal combustion engines, replacing complex previous legislation for different types of vehicle.
Provision for the collection and application of the excise duties on mechanically-propelled vehicles and on carriages.
Creation of the Road Fund.

See also
Locomotives on Highways Act 1896
Motor Car Act 1903
Road Traffic Act 1930
Road Traffic Act 1934
Road speed limits in the United Kingdom

References

External links
Roads Act 1920 - Hansard

UK Legislation

1920 in British law
Roads in the United Kingdom
United Kingdom Acts of Parliament 1920
1920 in transport
Transport policy in the United Kingdom
History of transport in the United Kingdom
Transport legislation